Greatest Hits is the first compilation album by the American rock band Train, released on November 9, 2018, through Columbia Records. It includes a cover of Wham!'s
"Careless Whisper" featuring saxophonist Kenny G, as well as the single "Call Me Sir" and tracks from all their studio albums.

Background
Frontman Pat Monahan stated that he avoided putting out a greatest hits album because he "always thought of those records as a way of saying, 'Welp, it was fun while it lasted' and that stressed me out." Monahan said he later came around to the idea of compiling the band's hits as "We live in a new music world now and having people be able to find songs they love faster and easier seems like a great idea."

Track listing

Charts

Certifications

References

2018 greatest hits albums
Train (band) albums